Everything That Rises Must Converge may refer to:

Everything That Rises Must Converge, a collection of short stories by Flannery O'Connor
A short story in that collection
Everything That Rises Must Converge (album), by Sort Sol
"Everything That Rises Must Converge" (song), by Shriekback
"Everything That Rises Must Converge" (episode), from the TV series Thief
Everything That Rises: A Book of Convergences by Lawrence Weschler